Ibrahima Niane (born 11 March 1999) is a Senegalese professional footballer who plays as a forward for  club Angers on loan from Metz.

Club career 
On 31 January 2023, Niane joined Angers in Ligue 1 on loan with an option to buy.

Honours 
Metz
 Ligue 2: 2018–19
Individual
 UNFP Ligue 1 Player of the Month: September 2020

Career statistics

References

External links
 

Living people
1999 births
People from M'Bour
Association football forwards
Senegalese footballers
Senegal youth international footballers
FC Metz players
Angers SCO players
Ligue 1 players
Ligue 2 players
Senegalese expatriate footballers
Expatriate footballers in France
Senegalese expatriate sportspeople in France
Génération Foot players